Minnie the Moocher is a 1932 Betty Boop cartoon produced by Fleischer Studios and released by Paramount Pictures.

In 1994, Minnie the Moocher was voted #20 of the 50 Greatest Cartoons of all time by members of the animation field.

Plot
The cartoon opens with a live action sequence of the famous musician Cab Calloway and his orchestra performing an instrumental rendition of "St. James Infirmary". Betty Boop gets into an argument with her strict immigrant parents when she will not eat the traditional Hasenpfeffer.  She runs away with her boyfriend Bimbo, and sings excerpts of the Harry Von Tilzer song "They Always Pick on Me" and the song "Mean to Me".

Betty and Bimbo end up in a cave where a walrus-like apparition appears (voiced by  Calloway), who sings "Minnie the Moocher" and dances to the melancholy song. Calloway is joined in the performance by other ghosts, goblins, skeletons, and other creatures. Betty and Bimbo are subjected to skeletons drinking at a bar; ghost prisoners sitting in electric chairs; a cat with empty eye-sockets feeding her equally empty-eyed kittens; and so on. Betty and Bimbo both change their minds about running away and rush back home with the ghouls in hot pursuit. Betty makes it safely back to her home and hides under the blankets of her bed. As she shakes in terror, the note she earlier wrote to her parents tears, leaving "Home Sweet Home" on it. The film ends with Calloway performing the instrumental "Vine Street Blues".

Cast
 Mae Questel and Margie Hines as Betty Boop
 Claude Reese as Bimbo
 William Pennell as Betty Boop's father
 Cab Calloway and His Cotton Club Orchestra as Cavern Monsters

Reception
The Film Daily, on January 10, 1932, wrote: "This Max Fleischer musical cartoon is one of the best turned out so far with the cute pen-and-ink star, Betty Boop, who seems to be getting more sexy and alluring each time, and her boyfriend, Bimbo. The musical portion is supplied by Cab Calloway and his orchestra, and what these boys can't do to the 'Minnie the Moocher' number isn't worth mentioning. Cab and his boys are shown only for a brief moment at the opening. Then a cartoon character, a big walrus with serpentine hips, performs the gyrations to the tune of the 'Minnie' song. The effect is short of a knockout, especially to those who are familiar with Cab's stuff on the radio or stage or night club. Betty Boop's part in the action concerns her running away from home because of her bad parents. With Bimbo she goes into a cave, where spooky figures and eerie noise give them such a scare that they beat it back home."

Notes
Clips of the redrawn colorized version were used in the compilation film Betty Boop for President: The Movie (1980).

References

External links

Watch Minnie the Moocher (uncensored) in fully restored HD at Laugh Bureau Vintage
Minnie the Moocher at Big Cartoon Database
Minnie the Moocher at Internet Archive
Minnie the Moocher at YouTube

1932 films
Films originally rejected by the British Board of Film Classification
American black-and-white films
Betty Boop cartoons
Short films directed by Dave Fleischer
1930s American animated films
Articles containing video clips
1932 animated films
Paramount Pictures short films
Fleischer Studios short films
1930s English-language films